Cranberry Prairie is an unincorporated community in southern Granville Township, Mercer County, in the U.S. state of Ohio.

History
A post office called Cranberry Prairie was established in 1851, and remained in operation until 1904. Besides the post office, Cranberry Prairie has a Catholic church and a country store.

References

Unincorporated communities in Mercer County, Ohio
Unincorporated communities in Ohio